The following is a list of notable deaths in September 1999.

Entries for each day are listed alphabetically by surname. A typical entry lists information in the following sequence:
 Name, age, country of citizenship at birth, subsequent country of citizenship (if applicable), reason for notability, cause of death (if known), and reference.

September 1999

1
Hubert Bobo, 65, American gridiron football player.
Boots Poffenberger, 84, American Major League Baseball player.
S. Srinivasan, 58, Indian aeronautical engineer.
W. Richard Stevens, 48, American author of computer science books.
Doreen Valiente, 77, English wiccan, pancreatic cancer.

2
Romolo Carboni, 88, Italian prelate of the Catholic Church.
Virginia Gutiérrez de Pineda, 77, Colombian anthropologist.
Margherita Guarducci, 96, Italian archaeologist, classical scholar, and epigrapher.
Philip Francis Murphy, 66, American clergyman of the Roman Catholic Church, cancer.
Lajos Szűcs, 53, Hungarian Olympic weightlifter.

3
Frans Cools, 81, Belgian cyclist.
Paul Lucien Dessau, 89, British painter.
Abdul Cader Shahul Hameed, 72, Sri Lankan diplomat and political figure.
George Hunt, 83, American rower and Olympic gold medalist.
Franz Pleyer, 88, Austrian-French football player.

4
Emilio Aldecoa, 76, Spanish football player.
Georg Gawliczek, 80, German football manager and player.
Charles Lee, 75, English cricket player.
Shlomo Morag, 73, Israeli professor of Hebrew.
Orlando Pereira, 50, Brazilian football player and manager.
Klement Slavický, 88, Czech composer of modern classical music.

5
Alan Clark, 71, British Conservative politician, Member of Parliament (1974–1999), and military historian, brain cancer.
Allen Funt, 84, American television personality (Candid Camera), stroke.
Bryce Mackasey, 78, Canadian politician and ambassador to Portugal.
Charles Onyeama, 82, Nigerian jurist and judge.
Walther Reyer, 77, Austrian actor.
Ivor Roberts, 74, British actor and a television continuity announcer.
Leonid Sedov, 91, Soviet and Russian mathematician.
Geraldo de Proença Sigaud, 89, Brazilian prelate of the Roman Catholic Church.
Katie Webster, 63, American boogie-woogie pianist, heart failure.

6
Arnold Fishkind, 80, American jazz bassist.
René Lecavalier, 81, Canadian French-language radio show host and sportscaster.
Steve Little, 43, American football player, accident.
Tamás Mendelényi, 63, Hungarian fencer and Olympic champion.

7
Thierry Claveyrolat, 40, French road bicycle racer, suicide.
Hugo del Vecchio, 71, Argentine basketball player.
Bjarne Iversen, 86, Norwegian cross-country skier.
Robert Simon, 45, American outlaw biker and convicted murderer, homicide.
E.G. van de Stadt, 89, Dutch yacht designer.

8
Birgit Cullberg, 91, Swedish choreographer.
Mark Gardner, 43, American convicted murderer, execution by lethal injection.
Lagumot Harris, 60, President of the Republic of Nauru.
Brian Hildebrand, 37, American professional wrestler, wrestling manager and referee, stomach and bowel cancer.
Moondog, 83, American musician, composer, theoretician and poet, heart failure.
Lev Razgon, 91, Soviet and Russian journalist, writer and human rights activist.
Vladimir Samoylov, 75, Soviet and Russian film and theater actor.
Herbert Stein, 83, American economist.
Alan Willett, 52, American convicted murderer, execution by lethal injection.

9
Abdel Latif Boghdadi, 81, Egyptian politician, air force officer and judge, cancer.
Chili Bouchier, 89, English film actress.
Jogesh Das, 72, Indian short-story writer and novelist.
Arie de Vroet, 80, Dutch football player and manager.
Tony Duquette, 85, American artist, Parkinson's disease.
Catfish Hunter, 53, American baseball player and member of the MLB Hall of Fame, ALS.
Mahmoud Karim, 83, Egyptian squash player.
Marco Papa, 41, Italian motorcycle racer, traffic collision.
Chan Parker, 74, American writer and wife of jazz musician Charlie Parker.
Ruth Roman, 76, American actress.
Fons van der Stee, 71, Dutch politician.

10
Michèle Fabien, 54, Belgian writer and playwright, cerebral hemorrhage.
Beau Jocque, 45, Louisiana French Creole zydeco musician and songwriter, heart failure.
Alfredo Kraus, 71, Spanish tenor.
Jean Messagier, 79, French painter, sculptor, printmaker and poet.
M. C. Richards, 83, American poet, potter, and writer.
Margaret Stuart, 65, New Zealand sprinter and Olympian.
Cleveland Williams, 66, American heavyweight boxer, killed in a hit and run accident.

11
Mohammed Aly Fahmy, 78, Egyptian field marshal,.
Belkis Ayón, 32, Cuban printmaker, suicide.
Gonzalo Rodríguez Bongoll, 28, Uruguayan racing driver, racing accident.
Johny Jaminet, 69, Luxembourgian football player.
David Karp, 77, American novelist and television writer, pulmonary emphysema.
Bobby Limb, 74, Australian entertainer and radio personality, cancer.
Francisco José Pérez, 79, Spanish-Cuban chess player.
Jacob Rabinow, 89, Engineer and inventor.
Janet Adam Smith, 93, Scottish writer, editor and literary journalist.
Momčilo Đujić, 92, Serbian Orthodox priest and Chetnik commander during World War II.

12
Alfred Leo Abramowicz, 80, American prelate in the Roman Catholic Church.
Laurette Luez, 71, American actress and model.
Bill Quackenbush, 77, Canadian ice hockey player, pneumonia.
Allen Stack, 71, American swimmer and Olympic champion.

13
Goro Adachi, 86, Japanese ski jumper and Olympian.
Roland Blanche, 55, French actor, heart attack.
Benjamin Bloom, 86, American educational psychologist.
Harry Crane, 85, American comedy writer.
Miriam Davenport, 84, American painter and sculptor, cancer.
Erik Diesen, 76, Norwegian revue writer and radio and television personality.
Bill Lohrman, 86, American baseball player.
Vladimir Pogačić, 79, Yugoslav film director.

14
Joel Beck, 56, American artist and cartoonist, complications from alcoholism.
Jehan Buhan, 87, French fencer, Olympic champion.
Charles Crichton, 89, English film and television director (A Fish Called Wanda, The Lavender Hill Mob, Space: 1999).
Miguel Angel Cuello, 53, Argentinian boxer.
Chuck Higgins, 75, American saxophonist, lung cancer.

15
Larry Gene Ashbrook, 47, American mass murderer, suicide.
Stewart Bovell, 92, Australian politician.
Renato Constantino, 80, Filipino historian.
Lila Leeds, 71, American film actress, heart attack.
Michel Pinseau, 73, French architect.
Jack Hardiman Scott, 79, British journalist and broadcaster.
Petr Shelokhonov, 70, Russian actor, director, filmmaker and socialite.
Bill Westwood, 73, British anglican bishop.
Abdolhossein Zarrinkoob, 76, Iranian scholar.

16
Paul Gregory, 91, American baseball player.
Viktar Hanchar, 42, Belarusian politician, kidnapped and murdered by the Lukashenko regime.
Endre Rozsda, 85, Hungarian-French painter.
Utaemon Ichikawa, 92, Japanese film actor.

17
Leonard Carlitz, 91, American mathematician.
Riccardo Cucciolla, 75, Italian actor and voice actor.
Rajeshwar Dayal, 90, Indian diplomat and writer, stroke.
Liane Collot d’Herbois, 91, British painter and painting therapist.
Ellen Frank, 95, German film and television actress.
Joan Gardner, 84, British actress.
Hasrat Jaipuri, 77, Indian poet.
Harold Johnson, 79, American basketball player.
Gary Koshnitsky, 91, Australian chess master.
François Müller, 72, Luxembourgian football player.
Henri Storck, 92, Belgian author, filmmaker and documentarist.
Rathvon M. Tompkins, 87, United States Marine Corps major general, stroke.
Frankie Vaughan, 71, British singer, heart failure.

18
Leo Amberg, 87, Swiss professional road bicycle racer.
Philip N. Krasne, 94, American motion picture and television producer.
Harold F. Kress, 86, American film editor.
Gérard Landry, Argentinian actor.
Noel Pope, 91, New Zealand rower and Olympian.
Viktor Safronov, 81, Soviet astronomer.
Leo Valiani, 90, Italian historian, politician and journalist.
Leszek Wodzyński, 53, Polish hurdler and Olympian.

19
Ed Cobb, 61, American musician, songwriter, and record producer, leukemia.
Livio Isotti, 72, Italian road bicycle racer.
Pavle Ivić, 74, Serbian Slavic dialectologist and phonologist.
Bua Kitiyakara, 89, Thai actress and wife of prince Nakkhatra Mangala.
Kjell Kristiansen, 74, Norwegian football player.

20
Erland Almqvist, 87, Swedish sailor and Olympic silver medalist.
Raisa Gorbacheva, 67, Russian activist, leukemia.
Taheyya Kariokka, 84, Egyptian belly dancer and film actress, pneumonia.
Robert Lebel, 93, Canadian ice hockey administrator.
Karl Heinrich Menges, 91, German linguist.
Willy Millowitsch, 90, German actor and director, heart failure.
T. R. Rajakumari, 77, Indian film actress, singer and dancer.

21
Georgia Louise Harris Brown, 81, American architect.
Robert Galbraith Heath, 84, American psychiatrist.
Benny Kalama, 83, American singer and arranger.
Sander Thoenes, 30, Dutch journalist, shot in East Timor.

22
Doris Allen, 63, American politician, colorectal cancer.
Noriko Awaya, 92, Japanese soprano chanteuse and ryūkōka singer.
Clive Jenkins, 73, British trade union leader.
Tomoo Kudaka, 36, Japanese football player, stomach cancer.
Paul Magès, 91, French inventor.
Jeanine Rueff, 77, French composer and music educator.
Sal Salvador, 73, American bebop jazz guitarist.
George C. Scott, 71, American actor (Patton, Dr. Strangelove, The Hustler), Oscar winner (1971), abdominal aortic aneurysm.
Chester Starr, 84, American historian.
Vasili Trofimov, 80, Soviet football player.

23
Ivan Goff, 89, Australian screenwriter, Alzheimer's disease.
Sir Piers Jacob, 63, Financial Secretary of Hong Kong (1986 – 1991).
Ri Jong-ok, 83, Premier of North Korea ( 1977 – 1984).
Werner Vycichl, 90, Austro-Hungarian philologist, linguist, and academic.

24
Robert Bend, 85, Canadian politician.
Ester Boserup, 89, Danish and French economist.
Rowena Mary Bruce, 80, English chess player.
Judith Exner, 65, American socialite and mistress of John F. Kennedy, breast cancer.
Jack Kiefer, 59, American golfer, cancer.
Anneli Cahn Lax, 77, American mathematician.
Tarmo Manni, 78, Finnish actor.
Billy Pricer, 65, American gridiron football player.

25
Marion Zimmer Bradley, 69, American author of fantasy and science fiction, heart attack.
Teodor Kocerka, 72, Polish rower and Olympic medalist.
Des O'Neil, 78, Australian politician, Deputy Premier of Western Australia. (1975 – 1980).
Guido Pontecorvo, 91, Italian-Scottish geneticist.
Anna Shchetinina, 91, Soviet merchant marine sailor.
Ding Sheng, 85, Chinese general and politician.

26
Enzo Carli, 89, Italian art historian and art critic.
Malky McDonald, 85, Scottish football player and manager.
Bernadette O'Farrell, 75, Irish actress.
Donald Sanders, 69, American lawyer and a key figure in the Watergate investigation, cancer.

27
Philip Haddon-Cave, 74, British colonial administrator, heart attack.
Herbert Heilpern, 80, Austria-American association football executive.
Billy Mould, 79, English footballer.
Monique Rolland, 85, French film actress.
Krishna Pal Singh, 77, Indian activist and politician.
Grant Warwick, 77, professional ice hockey player.

28
Franco Caracciolo, 79, Italian conductor.
Arumugam Ponnu Rajah, 88, Singaporean judge, diplomat and politician.
Escott Reid, 94, Canadian diplomat.
Marilyn Silverstone, 70, English photojournalist and ordained buddhist nun, cancer.

29
Arnold Earley, 66, American baseball player.
Walter Joyce, 62, English football player and manager.
Gé Korsten, 71, South African opera tenor and actor, suicide.
Yevhen Lapinsky, 57, Ukrainian volleyball player and Olympic champion.
Gustavo Leigh, 79, Chilean general, cardiovascular ailments.
Jean-Louis Millette, 64, Canadian French-speaking actor and writer.
Edward William O'Rourke, 81, American Roman Catholic bishop.
Armando Velasco, 81, Ecuadorian-Mexican actor.

30
Avni Akyol, 68, Turkish politician, heart attack.
Nikolay Annenkov, 100, Soviet and Russian actor.
Edward C. Banfield, 82, American political scientist.
Osvaldo Alfredo da Silva, 75, Brazilian football player.
Tommy Gale, 65, American  NASCAR race car driver.
Thomas Holland, 91, English prelate of the Catholic Church.
Bruce K. Holloway, 87, American Air Force general, heart failure.
Dmitry Likhachov, 92, Russian medievalist, linguist and concentration camp survivor.
John Merriman, 63, British long-distance runner and Olympian.
Anna Mae Winburn, 86, American vocalist and jazz bandleader.

References 

1999-09
 09